John Craven is a British television broadcaster.

John Craven may also refer to:

 John Craven (actor) (1916–1995), American stage and screen actor
 John Craven (footballer) (1947–1996), English former professional footballer
 John Craven (businessman) (1940–2022), South African/British businessman
 John Craven (economist) (born 1949), Vice-Chancellor of the University of Portsmouth
 John Chester Craven (1813–1887), locomotive carriage and wagon superintendent of the London, Brighton and South Coast Railway
 John P. Craven (1924–2015), United States Navy chief scientist for special projects
 John Craven, 1st Baron Craven of Ryton (1610–1648)